Zurab Beridze (born 4 February 1958) is a Georgian diplomat. A Doctor of Historical Sciences, Mr.Beridze has worked in the diplomatic service since 1991.  He was the Head of the Georgian Foreign Minister’s Secretariat from 2018 to 2021. He served as Georgia Ambassador to Romania and Moldova from 2004 to 2008 and became Georgia's Ambassador to Bulgaria in November 2013. Zurab Beridze currently occupies the position of the Georgian Ambassador Extraordinary and Plenipotentiary to the Republic of Poland.  

He was born in Tbilisi and graduated from the Tbilisi State University with a degree in History.

References

1958 births
Diplomats of Georgia (country)
Ambassadors of Georgia (country) to Bulgaria
Ambassadors of Georgia (country) to Moldova
Diplomats from Tbilisi
Tbilisi State University alumni
Living people
Ambassadors of Georgia (country) to Romania